Stourton is a village and civil parish beside the River Stour about  southeast of Shipston-on-Stour. The population taken at the 2011 census was 159.  Stourton is contiguous with the larger village of Cherington.

References

External links
 Cherington, Stourton & Sutton-under-Brailes community website.

Villages in Warwickshire